Jozef Gašpar (born 23 August 1977 in Rožňava) is a professional Slovak football player of Hungarian ethnicity. He currently plays for Vasas SC.

Club statistics

References

External links

Vegalta Sendai
HLSZ

1977 births
Living people
People from Rožňava
Hungarians in Slovakia
Slovak footballers
Association football defenders
Slovak expatriate footballers
FK Inter Bratislava players
J2 League players
Vegalta Sendai players
ŠK Slovan Bratislava players
Diósgyőri VTK players
Panionios F.C. players
A.O. Kerkyra players
Ethnikos Asteras F.C. players
Expatriate footballers in Japan
Slovak expatriate sportspeople in Japan
Expatriate footballers in Hungary
Slovak expatriate sportspeople in Hungary
Expatriate footballers in Greece
Slovak expatriate sportspeople in Greece